Les Loges is the name or part of the name of several communes in France:

Les Loges, Calvados, in the Calvados département 
Les Loges, Haute-Marne, in the Haute-Marne département 
Les Loges, Seine-Maritime, in the Seine-Maritime département
Les Loges-en-Josas, in the Yvelines département 
Les Loges-Marchis, in the Manche département 
Les Loges-Margueron, in the Aube département 
Les Loges-Saulces, in the Calvados département 
Les Loges-sur-Brécey, in the Manche département